Centaurea iberica, the Iberian knapweed or Iberian star-thistle, is a species of Centaurea.  It is native to southeastern Europe and southwestern Asia. It is known elsewhere as an introduced species and a noxious weed.

Control
Aminocyclopyrachlor + chlorsulfuron, aminopyralid, chlorsulfuron alone, clopyralid, clopyralid + 2,4-Dichlorophenoxyacetic acid, dicamba, diflufenzopyr + dicamba, picloram, and triclopyr + clopyralid for the Pacific Northwest of North America.

References

External links

Jepson Manual Treatment
Photo gallery

iberica
Flora of Lebanon
Plants described in 1826